Manuel Barbeyto (March 20, 1902 – July 24, 1994) was a Filipino actor of early 1920s before the war struck in the City of Manila. Barbeyto made his first appearance in the silent movie Mary, I Love You in 1921. He is known to play villanous roles.

Background
Barbeyto was born on March 20, 1902 in Tondo, Manila City, where he was raised by his parents, Inocencio Barbeyto and Catalina Costosa. He made two movies under Filippine Pictures, Ang Batang Tulisan  with Mary Walter and Dalagang Silangan. He was one of the youngsters in 1939 movie Mga Anak ng Lansangan (Sons of the Street), Santa (Saint) under Majestic Pictures and his last movie before the war Mahal Pa Rin Kita (I Still Love You). Barbeyto returned doing mature roles in 1946 in the movies Tayug, Ang Batang Api, Siyudad sa Ilalim ng Lupa (City under the Ground), Walang Kamatayan (Immortal),  Limang Misteryo (Seven Mysteries), and many more.

Filmography
 Mary I Love You - 1926
 Mga Dugo sa Kapirasong Lupa - 1930
 Lantang Bulaklak - 1932
 Krus na Bato - 1934
 Buhok ni Ester - 1936
 Ilaw ng Langit - 1937
 Ang Batang Tulisan  - Filippine Pictures - 1938
 Dalagang Silangan - Filippine Pictures - 1938
 Arimunding-Arimunding  - Excelsior Pictures - 1939
 Ikaw ang Dahilan  - Sanggumay Pictures - 1939
 Mga Anak ng Lansangan  - Eastern Pictures - 1939
 Pag-ibig ng Isang Ina  - Phils. Artist Guild - 1939
 Mahal Pa Rin Kita  - Excelsior Pictures - 1940
 Santa  - Majestic Pictures - 1940
 Walang Kamatayan - Luz V. Minda - 1946
 Tayug (Ang Bayang Api)  - Pedro Vera Pictures - 1947
 Kumakaway ka Pa Irog - Bayani Pictures - 1949
 Siyudad sa Ilalim ng Lupa  - X'Otic Pictures - 1949
 Pedro,  Pablo,  Juan at Jose  Luis F. Nolasco Production - 1950
 Lihim ni Bathala  - Royal Films - 1951
 Limang Misteryo  - Continental Pictures - 1954
 Sapagka't Mahal Kita  - Fremel Pictures - 1955

References

External links
 

1902 births
1994 deaths
People from Tondo, Manila
Male actors from Manila
20th-century Filipino male actors